Fredericton-Nashwaaksis was a provincial electoral district for the Legislative Assembly of New Brunswick, Canada.  It was first created in the 2006 redrawing of electoral districts and was first used in the general election later that year.

History 

It was created in 2006 as a result of rapid population growth in the City of Fredericton north of the Saint John River.  It includes those parts of the old Fredericton North district that were west of the Westmorland Street Bridge as well as some suburban communities previously in the district of Mactaquac.

Members of the Legislative Assembly

Election results 

* This was a new district being contested for the first time, being made up in parts from the former districts of Fredericton North and Mactaquac.  The majority of the district came from Fredericton North, which had been held by the Liberals, while Mactaquac had been held by the Progressive Conservatives.  Burke was the incumbent from Fredericton North.

See also 
 New Brunswick electoral redistribution, 2006

References 

 "An Electoral Map for New Brunswick: Final Report of the Electoral Boundaries and Representation Commission"
 Office of the Chief Electoral Officer.  "2006 Provincial Election Results"

External links 
Website of the Legislative Assembly of New Brunswick
Map of Fredericton-Nashwaaksis riding as of 2010 from Elections NB

New Brunswick provincial electoral districts
Politics of Fredericton